Andrea Petkovic was the defending champion, but did not participate because of an ankle injury.

Francesca Schiavone won the title, defeating Alizé Cornet in the final 6–4, 6–4.

Seeds

Draw

Finals

Top half

Bottom half

Qualifying

Seeds

Qualifiers

Lucky loser
  María José Martínez Sánchez
  Mandy Minella

Qualifying draw

First qualifier

Second qualifier

Third qualifier

Fourth qualifier

References 
Main Draw
Qualifying Draw

Internationaux de Strasbourg - Singles
2012 Women's Singles
2012 in French tennis